The Argonauts is a book by poet and critic Maggie Nelson, published in 2015. It mixes philosophical theory with memoir. The book discusses her romantic relationship with the transgender artist Harry Dodge leading to her pregnancy as well as topics ranging from the death of a parent, transgender embodiment, academia, familial relationships, and the limitations of language. Nelson also explores and criticizes ideas from several philosophers including Gilles Deleuze, Judith Butler and Eve Kosofsky Sedgwick. The title is a reference to Roland Barthes' idea that to love someone is similar to an Argonaut who constantly replaces parts of their ship without the ship changing names. The book won a National Book Critics Circle Award for criticism for books published in 2015.

References

2015 non-fiction books
American non-fiction books
Transgender non-fiction books
Books about families
National Book Critics Circle Award-winning works
Philosophy books
Graywolf Press books
2010s LGBT literature
LGBT literature in the United States